Queen Charlotte Sound is the name of two channels:

Queen Charlotte Sound (Canada), located in British Columbia
Queen Charlotte Sound / Tōtaranui, located in New Zealand's Marlborough Sounds